Ghulam Murtaza Bhutto (18 September 1954 – 20 September 1996) was a Pakistani politician and leader of al-Zulfiqar, a Pakistani left-wing militant organization. The son of Zulfikar Ali Bhutto, the former Prime Minister of Pakistan, he earned a bachelor's degree from Harvard University and a master's degree from the University of Oxford. Murtaza founded al-Zulfiqar after his father was overthrown and executed in 1979 by the military regime of General Zia-ul-Haq. In 1981, he claimed responsibility for the murder of conservative politician Chaudhry Zahoor Elahi, and the hijacking of a Pakistan International Airlines airplane from Karachi, during which a hostage was killed. In exile in Afghanistan, Murtaza was sentenced to death in absentia by a military tribunal.

He returned to Pakistan in 1993 and was arrested for terrorism on the orders of his sister, then-Prime Minister Benazir Bhutto. Released on bail, Murtaza successfully contested elections to the Sindh Provincial Assembly, becoming a vocal critic of Benazir and her husband Asif Ali Zardari. After increasing tensions between the two, he was shot dead along with six associates in a police encounter near his home in Karachi on 20 September 1996. Benazir's government was dismissed a month later by President Farooq Leghari primarily citing Murtaza's death and corruption. Zardari was arrested and indicted for Murtaza's murder, but acquitted in 2008. Murtaza's own faction of his father's Pakistan People's Party–Shaheed Bhutto, remains active in politics.

Biography

Early life and education
Born into the Bhutto family in Karachi on 18 September 1954, to Zulfiqar Ali Bhutto and Nusrat Bhutto, he received his early education at St. Mary's Academy. He was born in a Satti Rajput Bhutto family, and has three siblings: Benazir, Shahnawaz and Sanam. He later passed his 'O' levels from the Karachi Grammar School in 1971. In 1972, Murtaza went off to Harvard University where he took his bachelor's degree. For a period of time, he was the roommate of Texas gubernatorial candidate and former mayor of Houston, Bill White. In 1976, Bhutto graduated with his thesis entitled "Modicum of Harmony". His thesis dealt with the spread of nuclear weapons in general, and the implications of India's nuclear weapons on Pakistan in particular. Murtaza went on to attend Christ Church Oxford, his father's alma mater, for a three-year Master of Letters (MLitt) degree course. Bhutto submitted his master thesis, containing a vast argumentative work on Nuclear strategic studies, where he advocated for Pakistan's right to develop its nuclear deterrence programme to counter Indian nuclear programme. While in Europe studying for his PhD studies, his sister, Benazir Bhutto, had notified Murtaza Bhutto about the coup d'état led by General Zia-ul-Haq. Murtaza, along with his siblings, returned to Pakistan immediately. However, Zulfikar Ali Bhutto advised his children to leave the country in the shortest time possible. Murtaza was on the verge of rushing home when he received a message from his father asking him to remain abroad where he could mobilise an international campaign for his release.

Murtaza had been in Pakistan until Zulfikar Ali Bhutto's government was overthrown on 5  July 1977. Along with other family members, Murtaza had returned to Al-Murtaza, Larkana, and at the time was busy helping in the preparations for the elections scheduled for October 1977. But on 16 September 1977 when Ali Bhutto was arrested at Al-Murtaza, he asked his son to leave the country. After Ali Bhutto was sentenced, Murtaza joined hands with his brother, Shahnawaz Bhutto, to initiate a campaign to muster international support to revoke the death penalty looming over his father's head. Leaders from Syria, Libya, and the PLO were particularly supportive. Mercy appeals were sent by several heads of state to General Zia-ul-Haq; however, all these appeals were disregarded and Zulfiqar Ali Bhutto was executed. Murtaza and Shahnawaz both cut short their respective courses of study and decided to devote themselves to avenge their father's death. Eventually they resorted to taking up arms, their main target being Zia-ul-Haq. This marked the beginning of a new and more controversial era in Murtaza's life.

Al-Zulfiqar

Like his elder sister, Benazir, Murtaza Bhutto was a novice to active politics until 1978 when his father, Zulfiqar Ali Bhutto, was sentenced to death by the Lahore High Court. In the span of 15 years, however, Murtaza managed to gain considerable notoriety for a brand of politics that has moved in a direction that was diametrically opposed to Benazir's. Al-Zulfiqar was a leftist insurgency and militant organisation of Pakistan. It was formed in the late seventies by the sons of former Pakistani Prime Minister, Zulfikar Ali Bhutto, who was also the Chairman of Pakistan's biggest political party, the Pakistan Peoples Party (PPP). Al-Zulfiqar was formed to avenge the execution of Ali Bhutto by the right-wing military regime of General Mohammad Zia-ul-Haq in 1979. Zia had deposed the populist Bhutto regime in a military coup in July 1977. Bhutto was hanged by the Zia regime after a closed military trial. Ali Bhutto's two sons, Murtaza and Shahnawaz went into exile in Afghanistan which was at that time controlled by communist revolutionary government of Babrak Karmal. There the two sons formed Al-Zulfiqar along with hundreds of Pakistan Peoples Party militants who had escaped Zia's persecution. The Al-Zulfiqar Organization (AZO) was born at this point, and disgruntled elements among the younger members of the PPP, disappointed in the party's leadership, flocked to Murtaza's side. The AZO, however, went on to earn the title of terrorist organisation due to its various terrorist activities throughout the country, a label which dogged Murtaza till he died. For his part, Murtaza always denied the charge that he espoused the politics of terrorism.

1981 PIA hijack

Al-Zulfiqar hijacked a Pakistan International Airlines flight after and diverted it to Kabul in March 1981. From Kabul the journey went on to Damascus, Syria. The hijacking went on for thirteen days, during which Murtaza shot Major Tariq Rahim for being an Army officer. Rahim was executed following Murtaza's conferring with Afghan Intelligence (KHAD) chief Mohammad Najibullah. The Zia government had to accept the demands of the hijackers, releasing dozens of prisoners languishing in Pakistani jails and flying them to Tripoli.

Prosecution of the hijack 
In 2003 the case against Murtaza Bhutto and his brother was concluded quietly absolving them from blame relating to the PIA Hijacking, according to Fatima Bhutto's Book – Songs of Blood and Sword. In the book, she indicates that the actual leader of the hijacking was Salamullah Tipu. Tipu had attempted to join the AZO in Kabul, but was rejected as the AZO supposedly never accepted those that came to them (in what was to be a futile effort to prevent infiltration). Murtaza Bhutto was supposedly only to hear about the hijacking when Tipu called him in Afghanistan from the hijacked aircraft.

Contrary to this, Raja Anwar in his book The Terrorist Prince paints a negative picture of Murtaza Bhutto. He writes that the idea to hijack a plane came from Murtaza Bhutto himself, who was 'obsessed' about the tactic after the Palestinians resorted to it in the seventies and eighties. Anwar tells of an excited Murtaza who, while he had early advised Tipu on taking the aircraft to Damascus or Tripoli went into pragmatic overdrive once the plane landed in Kabul due to a shortage of fuel. Anwar, after detailed conversations with Salamullah Tipu, which he recounts in his book tells of the role Najibullah played along with Murtaza in directing the hijack from the Kabul airport control tower. Raja says that while the hijackers had arrived into Kabul with only revolvers, they were soon furnished with semi-automatic weapons after Murtaza's successive meetings with Tipu under the 'belly of the PIA aircraft'. The most compelling account from 'The Terrorist Prince' tell of the treatment meted out to Major Tariq Rahim, who was ADC to Murtaza's father Zulfiqar Ali Bhutto. Raja Anwar recounts the successive pleas (in the form of notes written on torn pieces of newspaper) Tariq Rahim made to Murtaza and Shahnawaz (Murtaza's younger brother) on account of his association with Zulfiqar Bhutto. These pleas according to one of the hijackers were delivered to Murtaza Bhutto, who not only discarded them, but instead instructed Salamullah Tipu to execute Tariq Rahim.

The books tells of countless stories of many activists who became fodder for Murtaza Bhutto in his quest to seek revenge for his father's judicial murder at the hands of General Zia-ul-Haq.

Rift with Asif Ali Zardari
After returning to Pakistan from exile , Bhutto offered his sister, Benazir Bhutto, the chance to revive the manifesto of PPP which his father championed. However, he was not happy with the ways of Benazir's husband Asif Ali Zardari and wanted him removed from influence in the PPP. When Benazir decided to side with her husband, Murtaza became a strong critic of the PPP government and the ongoing corruption. It is widely believed in Pakistan that this incident drove Zardari to rage and he used police machinery to assassinate Murtaza Bhutto. Benazir became highly unpopular after this incident and her limo was stoned by PPP workers when she tried to visit Murtaza's funeral ceremonies. After Benazir's government was dismissed in 1996, Zardari was detained for having a part in Murtaza's assassination. However, no charges were ever proven due to lack of evidence.

Personal life
Bhutto fell in love with a Afghan girl named, Fauzia Fasihuddin Bhutto, in Afghanistan. He married Fauzaia in 1980, and his brother Shahnawaz married her sister Rehana Fasihuddin. They had a daughter Fatima Bhutto. However, the marriage ended in divorce, and Bhutto along with his daughter moved to Syria, where he married the Lebanese dancer Ghinwa Bhutto in 1989. Bhutto, with his wife Ghinwa and daughter Fatima, later moved to Karachi in 1990, where the couple's son Zulfikar Ali Bhutto Jr was born.

Death
Just before his death, Bhutto, 42, had verbally attacked the government. "There would be trouble if the Police tries to arrest me without a warrant," he had declared.

Bhutto was sought by the police on the charge of inciting attacks on two CIA centres the previous Tuesday where it was thought that his party activist Ali Sunara was detained. 

On Thursday, 20 September 1996 at 6:35 p.m., Bhutto, along with six other party activists, was killed in an encounter with police near his residence in Clifton, Karachi. Among the dead was Aashiq Jatoi, the acting provincial chief of the Pakistan People's Party (Shaheed Bhutto Group). Jatoi was a brother in-law of Ghulam Mustafa Jatoi, the former Prime Minister of Pakistan. The injured list included six activists of Murtaza Bhutto's party and three policemen, including Superintendent of Police of Saddar area of Karachi and two other station house officers (SHOs).

Official explanation
A Sindh government handout issued late the night of Bhutto's death said that Bhutto's vehicle was allowed to proceed to his residence by SHO Clifton after it was stopped. Bhutto's gunmen, sitting on the land cruiser vehicle, resorted to indiscriminate firing injuring Area Superintendent of Police (ASP) Saddar, SHO Clifton and a person in a nearby taxi. Other gunmen sitting in Bhutto's vehicle also started firing straight at the police. The police, under the command of ASP Drakshan and ASP Saddar, returned fire in self-defence, and after an encounter of 20 to 25 minutes, took control of the situation.

The police claimed that they reached the Bhutto's residence at number 70 Clifton, at 8:30 p.m., to arrest him. The policemen alleged that security guards, belonging to Bhutto and stationed at his house, opened fire, injuring several policemen. Return fire by the police party caused fatal injuries to Bhutto and his supporters.

Police said Bhutto's followers, who were in three cars returning from a party, fired first when asked to stop. Police returned fire, killing six people, all members of Murtaza Bhutto's faction. This was confirmed by the Deputy Inspector General of police Shoaib Suddle. Suddle further said that the police had insisted on checking the vehicles because of tightened security after two bomb blasts in Karachi on Wednesday, 18 September 1996, in which one person was killed and at least four others were wounded. The party activists who were wounded were identified as Dr. Mazhar Memon, Siraj Hyder, Ismail, Ayaz, Asghar and Bachhal. The policemen who were shot were ASP Saddar Shahid Hayat, SHO Clifton Haq Nawaz Sayyal, and SHO Napier Junaid. Two injured policemen remained unidentified. The injured were moved to the Aga Khan Hospital and Civil Hospital. Those who were killed with Bhutto were identified as Ashiq Jatoi, Rehman Brohi, Sajjad Hyder, Abdul Sattar Rajpur, Yar Mohammed Baloch and Wajahat Jokhio. The bodies reached JPMC Hospital at about 3:30 a.m. The police arrested 12 supporters of Bhutto and seized about a dozen AK-47 rifles from their possession.

Some policemen who had stopped Bhutto's vehicle later claimed that they did not know whose car they had stopped. They said that they would not have opened fire on the motorcade had they known that it was Bhutto's. Others said that they had fired in panic and self-defence. Senior police officials were tight-lipped about the tragedy.

Sources said that after the incident the Rangers again cordoned off the area and searched the house.

Narrative of the Pakistan People's Party of Shaheed Bhutto
Dr. Mazhar Memon, Senior Vice-President of the party's Hyderabad Division, blamed the police for opening fire on Bhutto without any provocation. "We were returning from a public meeting at Surjani Town, District West of Karachi, when the police and Rangers stopped near the 70 Clifton," Dr. Memon stated at the JPMC Casualty Department. He said that Bhutto had exited the car to talk with the official. The policemen suddenly opened fire on Bhutto, seriously injuring him. Dr Memon said, "I also came out of the vehicle to help my injured leader who was on the ground and I received a bullet in my leg." Dr Memon added that when Bhutto's guards saw him on the ground in a pool of blood, they rushed out and opened fire on the police. The policemen ignored Bhutto and continued firing. Memon added that when the firing died down, the Rangers who were on the spot jumped from their vehicles.

Some eyewitnesses said that Bhutto, after getting out of his car, challenged the policemen to shoot him. A man was seen struggling for his life after being hit by police fire in front of the DIG police residence. The firing continued for half an hour, causing great panic in the area. Soon after the incident, when newsmen rushed to the hospital, they were beaten by highly emotionally charged policemen. The personnel of the law enforcement agencies cocked their guns and confiscated the cameras of photographers. One of the police officers ordered his force to open fire at journalists should they ignore his orders and advance.

Aftermath
Sources  said that when Murtaza Bhutto arrived at the Mideast hospital in an official car, blood was oozing from his mouth. He tried to take off the oxygen mask but the doctors kept replacing it. Bhutto then collapsed and lost consciousness. At this time Bhutto's wife Ghinva and daughter Fatimah, both of them crying, reached the hospital. They were ordered out of the ICU, where the only official present was the Deputy Commissioner South, Arif Elahi. Soon the specialist doctors from Jinnah Hospital reached the Mideast Hospital. No anesthetist was available at the hospital, which normally does not treat medico-legal cases. Murtaza was shot in his collarbone, chest, leg and abdomen. His body refused to accept a blood transfusion while he was being operated upon. Doctors revived his heart once when it stopped but failed to do so the second time. Murtaza Bhutto died at 11:45 p.m. but his death was not announced by the hospital authorities until 12:25 a.m.

On Saturday, the body was taken for burial by helicopter to Larkana, Sindh. The pilot of one of the helicopters which carried the body had difficulty in lifting the chopper as a number of supporters of Bhutto from Lyari, Karachi clung to the skids in a bid to board the aircraft. While the helicopter managed to lift off, many of the visibly moved supporters fell down. One, however, clung to the helicopter. The helicopter flew up to sea side and then returned and landed at Bagh Ibn-e-Qasim where the youth clinging to the helicopter's skid fell down and the chopper flew away. Bhutto was laid to rest at the Bhutto family mausoleum in Garhi Khuda Bakhsh near Larkana, Sindh, Pakistan.

Police trial
On 3 December 2009, a sessions court in Karachi acquitted of murder twenty policemen in the Murtaza Bhutto case pertaining to an armed attack on a police team in which two officials were wounded and a taxi driver was also killed. The same court also pardoned six workers of the Pakistan People's Party Shaheed Bhutto in the same case.

During the 13 years that the trial dragged on, a number of judges were appointed to hear the murder case. The change of judges is one of the many reasons behind the delay in disposal of the present case. Other reasons include a lack of interest of the prosecution witnesses and long adjournments sought by the counsel for President Asif Ali. The acquitted included Mazhar Memon, Asghar Ali, Asif Ali Jatoi, Mehmood Bhallai, Ghulam Mustafa Chandio and Akhter Ali Mirani. The police personnel acquitted include Shoaib Suddle, Wajid Durrani, Masood Sharif, Rai Tahir and others who were prosecution witnesses in this case.

See also
Pakistan Peoples Party
Pakistan Peoples Party (Shaheed Bhutto)

Further reading

References

External links
Interview with FatimaBhutto Radio France Internationale in English

1954 births
1996 deaths
Assassinated Pakistani politicians
Murtaza
Harvard University alumni
Karachi Grammar School alumni
Sindhi people
Pakistani people of Iranian descent
Pakistani democracy activists
People murdered in Pakistan
Pakistan People's Party politicians
Al-Zulfiqar
Pakistani expatriates in Syria
Pakistani exiles
Pakistani expatriates in Afghanistan
Hijackers
Pakistani dissidents
People from Clifton, Karachi
Pakistani socialists
People of the Soviet–Afghan War
Children of national leaders
Pakistani people of Kurdish descent
Children of prime ministers of Pakistan
Children of presidents of Pakistan
People shot dead by law enforcement officers in Pakistan
Deaths by firearm in Sindh